Gmina Radzanów may refer to either of the following rural administrative districts in Masovian Voivodeship, Poland:
Gmina Radzanów, Białobrzegi County
Gmina Radzanów, Mława County